Dynamic Network Authentication System (DNAS) was a proprietary authentication system created by Sony Computer Entertainment Inc made for the Playstation 2, Playstation Portable, and PSX (digital video recorder). DNAS retrieved information about a user's hardware and software for authentication, copy protection, account blocking, system, rules, or game management and other purposes.

Playstation 2 
DNAS used a set of codes in a protected area of the game DVD together with serial numbers from the console EEPROM for online authentication. Game backups or copies using regular DVD-R burners do not have this protected area, and the games failed to authenticate to the servers. To circumvent this, programs have been made available that patch the client portion of the game to report hardcoded values without attempting to access the protected area of the DVD. This made it possible to play online with game backups and illegal copies.

Some games have a double DNAS check to prevent people from patching them. These techniques have been introduced by Electronic Arts in most of their recent games, but it has not shown any positive results. Many new techniques for authentication were tried, with very little success for the game companies.

Discontinuation 
The DNAS service was terminated on 4 April 2016 for NTSC/U and PAL regions after the last official online game, Final Fantasy XI, was taken offline on 31 March 2016, but continued to support NTSC/J PS2 titles and the Playstation Store on the Playstation Portable. However unofficial private servers allowed game play on other PS2 games until 4 April. Certain games continued to work beyond 4 April and are still operational thanks to certain workarounds.

References

Sony Interactive Entertainment